The General of Ili ( Officially ), also known in western sources as the Kuldya Military Governor, was a position created during the reign of the Qing Qianlong Emperor (r. 1735-1799) to "pacify" Dzungaria (now part of Xinjiang) and suppress uprisings by the Khoja "Rebels". The General of Ili governed the entire Xinjiang during Qing rule until it was turned into a province.

History 
Based in Huiyuan City (now Huiyuan Town, Huocheng County), in the Qing delineated greater Xinjiang region in the northwest of China, the general was the senior military commander in the area. In 1759, Qing general  (Manchu: Zhaohuui) suppressed the Revolt of the Altishahr Khojas and reestablished Qing control over the western part of Xinjiang. As a result, in 1762 the Qing court established the position of General of Ili with Ming Rui as the first incumbent.

At the same time, the offices of Military Attache or Dūtǒng and Imperial Resident were created under the general to manage military affairs north and south of the Tian Shan range of mountains. The northern circuit or Tarim Basin was administered by the Ili Ministerial Attache, five Ministerial Leaders, a Tarbagatai Ministerial Attache and a Minister of Affairs. In the south or Altishahr there was a General Minister for Altashahr Affairs responsible for Kashgar, Ye 'erqiang (now Yarkant County), Yingjisha'er (now Yengisar County), Uqturpan County, Aksu, Kuqa County, Hetian (now Hotan) and Kalash'er ( now Karasahr) amongst others.

In 1763, the Qianlong Emperor ordered the construction of the new city of Huiyuan on the north bank of the Ili River as a base for the General of Ili. Thereafter, Huiyuan became the capital of the Qing Xinjiang Region.

The headquarters of the Manchu bannermen was in Huiyuan and Huining while the Green Standard Army was distributed across the remaining towns with their commander in Suiding. Uyghur merchants (including the Taranchi) resided in Ningyuan. Their affairs were managed by the General of Ili through the East Yamen.	

In 1864, during the reign of the Tongzhi Emperor, the  broke out concurrent with the Dungan Revolt of 1862-77 further east. On 8 March 1866, a large force of Hui Muslims captured the General of Ili Mingsioi's Yamen. He committed suicide by blowing himself up but his predecessor Cangcing was captured and paraded through the streets.

After Tzarist Russia invaded the Ili Basin in 1865 they demolished Huiyuan then in 1876 Qing General Zuo Zongtang, at the head of a large army, ended Yaqub Beg's occupation of the southern part of Xinjiang. This new settlement was known historically as "New Huiyuan" (.

Xinjiang officially became a province in 1883 with its capital at Dihua Fu ( modern day Urumqi) and Huiyuan gradually lost its political status as the centre of the region. The General of Yili retained responsibility for defence in the north of the new province until the position was abolished following the 1911 Xinhai Revolution, which marked the end of Imperial China.

Incumbents

See also
 Xinjiang under Qing rule

Notes

References 

Military history of the Qing dynasty
History of Xinjiang